Downtown Mountain View station is an intermodal transit station located in Mountain View, California. The station is served by the Caltrain commuter rail service, on which it is simply called Mountain View station. The light rail part of the facility, known as Downtown Mountain View station, is served by Santa Clara VTA Orange Line service. VTA local buses and local shuttles are served from the Mountain View Transit Center on the Evelyn Avenue side of the station.

Downtown Mountain View is the western terminus of the Orange Line route. The station has one island platform serving the two light rail tracks and two side platforms serving the two Caltrain tracks; however the northbound Caltrain platform is technically also an island since it sits between their Main Track #1 and one of the VTA tracks (but it functions as a side platform, since the two systems' tracks are separated by a fence).

The station is sited along Evelyn Avenue at its northeastern corner with Castro Street, and is bordered on the north-northeast by the Central Expressway (Santa Clara County Route G6) which parallels both rail lines, as well as Evelyn, in this area. Centennial Plaza, at the corner of Evelyn & Castro, contains a replica depot building that was constructed in 2000 to pay homage to the demolished 1888-built Southern Pacific Railroad station and now houses a wine bar/shop. Headed away from Castro to the southeast along Evelyn is first Dentennial Plaza, then the Transit Center (bus) facility, followed by the public pay-parking lot for the entire intermodal facility (managed by Caltrain, with the main entrance at Evelyn Avenue & View Street). The Caltrain platforms can be accessed from Castro (via a walkway on north side of the replica depot), Centennial Plaza, the Transit Center, and the parking facility. The VTA's light rail platform is accessed from Castro Street, at the southeast corner of the Central Expressway.

Two pieces of public art were added during the construction of the light rail line.

References

External links 

Caltrain - Mountain View station
VTA - Mountain View station

Caltrain stations in Santa Clara County, California
Santa Clara Valley Transportation Authority light rail stations
Santa Clara Valley Transportation Authority bus stations
Railway stations in Mountain View, California
Railway stations in the United States opened in 1987
1987 establishments in California
Mountain View